Pathukudi (also Pathukudy and Paththukudi) is a Malayalam speaking Hindu community — mostly centered in Palakkad district of Kerala state, India. The community is found mainly in Panangattiri village of Kollengode sub district, of Palakkad district and spread across Vallanghy, Nemmara, Alathur, Vadavannur and Vithanaserry.

Other names used to refer this community are PathuMadom and Dashagotram.

Etymology

The name is derived from two Tamil/Malayalam words, ‘Pathu’ and ‘Kudi’, which mean ten families, ten households, ten clans, ten classes, ten Gotras or ten mutts. The other names of this community are DashaGotram and PathuMadom, which also imply the same meaning.

Origin: history and legend

Poompuhar Parvam (Poompuhar Canto)

The community is originated from a group of Shaivite Nagarathars who were specialized in the field of gem business in Poompuhar, Tamil Nadu. They were considered as elite class in Poompuhar society and had a dignified life as equal to Chola emperor. The community has its origin from the direct disciples of JnanaSambandhan (a Brahmin child saint who revived Hinduism in Tamil land-7th century CE). The people of the community were expertise in both classical Tamil and Sanskrit languages. Though they were followers of Shaivite sect of Hinduism, they were also worshippers of Vishnu, Indra and Iravan. They were vegetarians and scholars of Vedic sciences and philosophies apart from their business profession. Though this community had business profession and had later adopted ‘Shreshthi’ (Chetti) title, they did not mix with other Vaishya communities and have lived according to Brahmin tradition. These merchant Brahmin lords had maintained a separate army and land in Chola Empire and were authorized to collect taxes in their region.

Palayana Parvam (Exodus Canto)

Legend says that, centuries ago when a king of Chola Empire wished to marry a girl from this community. The community did not like that idea as alliances with other communities were prohibited. Though the community did not accept it, the king did not change his mind set. So the community, which comprises Ten Gotras, escaped from Chola kingdom at a midnight. Knowing this the king had sent his army men in search of them. As the community has understood imminent danger nearing them they scattered gems and other precious stones on their path to divert the attention of the soldiers. The soldiers spent much of the time to search these valuables in the sandy road. Though they escaped from soldiers but they could not find a solution when the nature came as an obstacle. It was a rainy season in Poompuhar. The Cauvery River was overflowing and they found it difficult to cross the river. They prayed at lord Ganesh temple nearby the river to save them if their deed was right. Their prayer got answered. The river got turned into two branches to enable them to cross the river without any difficulty. It is said that another Vaishya group who accompanied with them have taken a different route from there when they reached Avinashipattanam. By the advice of their Kula Guru they met Kollengode king. But Kollengode king asked them to contact Zamorin king of Kozhikode.

RakshaPurusha Parvam (The Protector Canto)

The Kula Guru of the community with his influence on Zamorin has made appointment for the community. They met Zamorin and had spent seven days in his palace. King Zamorin was highly impressed by the community leaders’ in depth knowledge of Vedic science, Puranas and on other various subjects. He had honored them by asking them to sit on silk-bed. While their stay at Kozhikkode, Chola emperor had sent his ambassadors to request the Zamorin to send them back to Poompuhar. But Zamorin had refused to do so and informed that the community is the distinguished guests of his kingdom. The community leaders then discarded their sacred thread after accepting the titles like Vadhyar, Panicker, Chettiyar (this title is a continuation from Poompuhar), Moothotty and Mannadiar from Zamorin. The king allowed the ten Mutts to be settled at his autonomous area in Palakkad called Panangattiry (which was also a land in dispute between kings of Palakkad and Zamorin). He asked both his counterparts of Kollengode and Palakkad to permit the community to lead an independent life as their own which should not be challenged by anyone of them at any cost.

Palaka Parvam (The Kingship Canto)

The people of Panangattiry (ThenPanassai) has welcomed this community to their land and called them as ‘Pathukudi’ as they represent ten different Gotras. Later Pathukudi community was collectively known as ‘Pathukudi Panickers’ irrespective of their titles. They built a Nagaram (town) under the footage of Thenmala hills and became the Deshavazhis (rulers) of the land with the consent of king Zamorin. They chose central area of the land to protect them from any outside invasion and for the effective administration of the land. The adjoining areas were given to Tamil Brahmins, Gounders, and Kulalas etc. They built temples for Bhagavathy (Goddess), lord Siva, and lord Ganesh and for their tutelary deity lord Iravan. (Lord Iravan temple is only one temple for Iravan at Kerala state) The chief of the community became ‘Palakan’ (ruler or chieftain) of the land and has used title as Rajah in front of the name. Their mutts became known as ‘Tharavads’ as in local name and Rajah’s one was known as ‘Kovilakom’. He used the lion depicted flag. Some families migrated to different parts of Palakkad afterwards.

Uchitajnata Parvam (Propriety Canto)

Pathukudi community’s prominence in the social set up came down after few centuries probably after decline of Zamorin dynasty. They led the rest of life as just petty landlords and agriculturalists. Their growth became stagnant at one stage due to rigid customs and disunity between different Tharavads. Later some Tharavads got ruined and after that some of the members became administrators in aristocratic Nair Tharavads. The community found a short fall in their count later because they were minority section in population in Kollengode. It is due to the same Gotra marriage is not permitted according to the customs and also alliances with other caste/-allied communities were strictly prohibited. So they solved the problem by splitting some ‘Tharavads’ into two numbers. But this was not a permanent solution. Then some ‘Tharavads’, which migrated to Kollengode, made alliance with Tharakan community (an Arya Vaishya community originated from Poompuhar) and a new community has originated in that region called ‘Pathukudi-Tharakan’ community. Some tharavads of Pathukudi community got revived later on with new names in Pananagattiri land.

Religion, temples and tutelary deity

The community generally follows Shaivite sect of Hinduism. As they are rooted from the disciples of JnanaSambandhan who revived Hinduism, they followed religious tolerance with other sects. So they gave importance to Vaishnavite gods. The ancestors of this community has preached that both Siva and Vishnu are the same and has lived according to that principle.

The following are the temples built by Pathukudi community at Panangattiry:

Sri Iravan
Sri Viswanathaswamy
Sri MahaGanapathy
Sri KurumbaBhagavathy
Sri Mariamman

Lord Iravan is the tutelary deity of Pathukudi community. He is the son of legendary warrior Arjuna and the Naga princess Ulupi. He is also called as Koothandavar or Koothanda colloquially. Iravan is worshipped in Tamil Nadu as ‘Aravan ‘ as a village deity. (In Tamil ‘Aravan’ effigy a cobrahood shelters His head which shows his Naga affiliation.) The idol placed in the sanctum sanctorum is a younger form of Iravan who is holding bow and arrow. Lord Krishna‘s idol is also installed in the same Garbha Griha.

They also built temples for Siva, Serpent gods, Bhagavathy and Mariamman in Panangattiri. Among various lamp poles dedicated to Sri Pudussery temple at Palakkad by various communities, Pathukudi community’s one is the largest one, which is also considered as main and sacred nature.

Customs and traditions

In their earlier life of Pananagttiri, they followed same Brahmin traditions. Their Mangalya Sutra and marriages were same as that of Tamil Brahmins and was changed subsequently. The Mangalya thread must be a yellow thread (not chain) during marriage ceremony as it is considered sacred and auspicious which is applicable for both rich and poor.

The community follows patriarchal system.

They wore tuft in front of their head as like Nairs and Namboothiris.

Being a Trivarnika community, the after death pollution (pula) is only for ten days.

The unique Chitragupta festival /Indrotsavam is celebrating by the community as a part of continuation of their Poompuhar life.

They observe Pillayar Noimbu for lord Ganesh like Tamil Nagarathar and all Vaishya communities.

References

Iravan Pattu- authored by Senapathy Panicker, Raja Velu Panicker & Ramar Guru.
Kanadu Kathan Karai Mel Azhakar by Dr. Jawahar Palaniappan.
Anpan Iravan-CD by Panangattiri Pathukudi Samudayam.

External links
 www.koothandavela.org

Kerala society
Social groups of Kerala
Malayali people
Social groups of India
Hindu communities